William George Brew (17 October 1918 – 11 July 1941) was a rugby league footballer in the Australian competition the New South Wales Rugby League in the years 1940 and 1941.

Playing career
A promising young centre. William Brew, or Bill as he was known, Played for the Eastern Suburbs club. A try scorer in the  Easts’ premiership winning side that defeated Canterbury Bankstown, in 1940. Brew made his 1st grade debut in the previous weeks semi-final against St George, when he was brought into the side as a replacement for the injured Dave Brown.

Death
The young centre's death came less than a year later. He died in Prince Henry Hospital, Sydney after contracting meningitis, following a match against an ‘invitational’ army side. He was buried at Botany Catholic Cemetery on 12 Jul 1941.

See also
 Bilbrew

References

 History Of The NSW Rugby League Finals;  Steve Haddan
 RL1908.com; Sean Fagan

1918 births
1941 deaths
Australian rugby league players
Rugby league wingers
Rugby league centres
Sydney Roosters players
Neurological disease deaths in New South Wales
Infectious disease deaths in New South Wales
Deaths from meningitis